There are several disputed territories of India. A territorial dispute is a disagreement over the possession or control of land between two or more states or over the possession or control of land by a new state and occupying power after it has conquered the land from a former state no longer currently recognized by the new state.

India faces territorial issues with some of its neighbours – the People's Republic of China, Pakistan and Nepal. It also has border dispute with the Republic of China on Taiwan. India has resolved its un-demarcated border with Bhutan, which included multiple irregularities. India also resolved its border disputes with Bangladesh and Sri Lanka.

Current disputes

China

Sino-Indian border 

Two governments claim to be the legitimate Chinese government, the People's Republic of China (PRC) and the Republic of China (ROC; commonly called "Taiwan"). They do not recognise the legitimacy of each other. The PRC has actual control of their areas on India-China border, while the ROC currently has no shared land or maritime border with India. Their views are presented below. The Line of Actual Control (LAC) is presently the operational border between India and the PRC.

People's Republic of China's position 

The Depsang Plains are located on the border of the Indian union territory of Ladakh and the disputed zone of Aksai Chin. The Chinese Army occupied most of the plains during its 1962 war with India, while India controls the western portion of the plains. The dispute remains unresolved.

Arunachal Pradesh is a state of India created on 20 January 1972, located in the far northeast. It borders the states of Assam and Nagaland to the south, and shares international borders with Burma in the east, Bhutan in the west, and China in the north. The majority of the territory is claimed by China, by whom it is called South Tibet. The northern border of Arunachal Pradesh reflects the McMahon Line, a line demarcated by the 1914 Simla Convention between the United Kingdom and the Tibetan government. The Simla Convention was never accepted by the Chinese government, and it was also considered invalid by Tibetans due to unmet conditions specified in the treaty. The boundary was not broadly enforced by the Indian government until 1950. Currently, this territory is administered by India.

Republic of China's position

Throughout the Cold War, the Government of the Republic of China had the same understanding on the China-India border dispute as the PRC. In 1962, the ROC's Ministry of Foreign Affairs stated that they did not recognise the legality of the McMahon Line. The same year western countries increased pressure on ROC leader Chiang Kai-shek to recognise the legality of the McMahon Line in order to isolate Beijing. However, Chiang dismissed the McMahon Line as an 'imperialist imposition on China'. In February 1987, India's move to elevate the status of 'Arunachal centrally administered region' to the state of Arunachal Pradesh was declared null and void by the ROC's Ministry of Foreign Affairs. The Ministry, in a formal statement, stated that it did not recognise the 'illegal occupation' of ROC territory south of the McMahon Line and that the establishment of 'Arunachal Pradesh state' was an illegal act. In 1995, Ambassador Teng Pei-Yin (the ROC's first representative to India) in response to an Indian member of parliament, stated that the ROC did not recognise the McMahon Line. However, the ROC has not made any statement on the China-India dispute since.

Disputed areas

The Chinese Military has an integrated Western Theater Command across the entire border with India. The Indian Military has divided the Line of Actual Control into 3 sectors - the western sector across Ladakh and the Chinese-held Aksai Chin, the central sector across Himachal Pradesh and Uttarakhand, and the eastern sector across Sikkim and Arunachal Pradesh. Similarly, the Indian Airforce has a New Delhi-based Western Air Command, a Prayagraj-based Central Air Command, and a Shillong-based Eastern Air Command with several AFS (Air Force Stations/Bases), AGL (Advanced Landing Ground airports) and helipads to cover the LAC.

List of disputed areas from west to east along the India-China border:

Within the geostrategic context of disputes between India and China, the disputes over Doklam and the Ten Degree Channel and South China Sea shipping lane are also relevant. Doklam is a dispute between Bhutan and China near the India-Bhutan-China tri-junction. India has sided with Bhutan in the dispute. The area is of strategic importance to all three countries. Doklam lies close to India's Siliguri "Chickenneck" Corridor where a Chinese military advance of less than  would cut off Bhutan, part of West Bengal and all of Northeast India, an area containing almost 50 million people. This scenario arose during the war between India and China in 1962. India has embarked on a slew of Northeastern India connectivity projects to create multiple alternatives to the Silliguri corridor, including through Bangladesh, National Waterways and seaports, to mitigate the risk of being cut off.

The world's busiest Sea line of communication (SLOC) passes through the Strait of Malacca and the Ten Degree Channel in the exclusive economic zone of India, a region protected by India's Andaman and Nicobar Command. It is a geostrategic choke point for China since over 94,000 merchant ships travel through every year, carrying 40% of the world's freight trade between China and other nations. US$5 trillion in annual shipping trade passes through the SLOC and choke points of Southeast Asia and the South China Sea (SCS). 80% of global trade passes through the Indian Ocean SLOC in the form of oil and natural gas critical for advanced economies. India, Australia, Japan and the United States have comprised the Quadrilateral Security Dialogue (QUAD) to contain China as part of their Indo-Pacific strategy.

Pakistan

Kashmir 

The conflict over Kashmir is primarily between India and Pakistan, with China largely playing a third-party role. Conflict started after the partition of India in 1947, as both India and Pakistan initially claimed the entirety of the former princely state of Jammu and Kashmir. In 1963, Pakistan recognized Chinese sovereignty over the Trans-Karakoram Tract and Aksai Chin. India controls 70% of Kashmir's population and approximately 55% of its land area including Jammu, Kashmir Valley, most of Ladakh, and Siachen Glacier. Pakistan controls approximately 30% of the land including Azad Kashmir and Gilgit-Baltistan. China controls the remaining 15% of the land, including Aksai Chin and the mostly uninhabited Trans-Karakoram Tract, as well as part of the Demchok sector.

Sir Creek 

Sir Creek is a 96 km (60 mi) tidal estuary in the uninhabited marshlands of the Indus River Delta on the border between India and Pakistan. It flows into the Arabian Sea and separates Gujarat state in India from Sindh province in Pakistan. The long-standing India-Pakistan Sir Creek border dispute stems from the demarcation "from the mouth of Sir Creek to the top of Sir Creek, and from the top of Sir Creek eastward to a point on the line designated on the Western Terminus". From this point onward, the boundary is unambiguously fixed as defined by the Tribunal Award of 1968.

Junagadh and Manavadar 
In a new political map released in 2020, Pakistan claimed the former princely states of Junagadh and Manavadar.

Nepal

Major areas of dispute between India and Nepal are Kalapani, Limpiyadhura, Lipulekh, Susta, Mechi, and Tanakpur. An estimated 60,000 hectares of border land is currently disputed between India and Nepal.

Kalapani territory

Although claimed by Nepal, Kalapani has been administered by Indian army since the 1962 border war with China and Indian maps have been showing Kalapani as part of India since long time. The 1816 Treaty of Sugauli signed by Kingdom of Nepal and British India in 1816 utilizes the Kali River as Nepal's western boundary with India. However, lack of consensus on what is the precise location of the river Kali has resulted in dispute over whether the land consisting Kalapani, Limpiyadhura and Lipulekh is part of India or Nepal. Some scholars suggest that the lack of consensus is because of British cartographers who kept on shifting the line demarcating the river eastwards for strategic reasons. However, there are also some scholars who believe that lack of consensus is due to the shift in the course of the river over time. 

In November 2019, India issued a new political map of the country which, like earlier maps, showed Kalapani as part of India. This new map was rejected by Nepal, and mass protest against India took place across the country and outside the Indian embassy in Nepal. Protesters accused India of occupying their land. In May 2020, the Indian Defence minister, Rajnath Singh inaugurated an 80 km road from Dharchula to Lipulekh pass. Nepal protested against the construction of the road. The Lipulekh area is currently under India's control. On 20 May 2020, Nepal launched its own map showing Kalapani, Limpiyadhura and Lipulekh as parts of its own territory. The new map was subsequently approved by the Nepali parliament on 18 June 2020. India opposed the move, claiming that the decision to include Limpiyadhura, Lipulekh and Kalapani is not based on evidence or historical facts.

On 15 June 2020, the Indian border police, Sashastra Seema Bal (SSB), reported that border pillars which served as demarcation were missing along the India-Nepal border. SSB also reported that Nepali border police had established five new border outposts near the disputed area. On 19 June, Nepal started deploying troops near the disputed areas. The troops had established camps and they were working on building a helipad in the area. In the same month Nepali Army Chief, General Purna Chandra Thapa, after visiting the Kalapani border area, stated that the Nepali Army will start building army barracks and border outposts near the Kalapani area. On 21 June, Indian residents in border villages of Dharchula and Jhoolaghat in Pithoragarh district claimed that radio stations in Nepal were conducting a propaganda campaign against India by playing anti-India songs and biased news bulletins showing India in a bad light.

Susta territory

Susta is another territory which is disputed between Nepal and India. It is currently controlled by India as a part of Bihar state. Media reported residents of a village in Susta claiming that Susta belongs to Nepal and they are Nepali citizens. The 1816 Treaty of Sugauli defined Gandaki river as the international boundary between India and Nepal. The right bank of the river was under Nepal's control while the left bank was under India's control. Susta village was initially on the right bank when the treaty was signed and it was a part of Nepal. However, over the years, the Gandaki river changed its course and Susta moved to the left bank and is now currently under India's control. The Government of Nepal has repeatedly stated that Susta belongs to Nepal and that the Indian government should return the area.

Resolved disputes

Sri Lanka
The dispute on the status of the island of Kachatheevu was settled in 1974 by an agreement between both countries. But still some cases are still ongoing in High Court of Madras which are filed earlier regarding this dispute stating as illegally issued to Sri Lanka. Several actions were still taken by the union government of India to retrieve that island back to Indian territory once again.

Bangladesh

South Talpatti (as it was known internationally) or Sheikh Mujib Island (as it was known by Bangladeshi Awami League supporters) was a small uninhabited offshore sandbar landform in the Bay of Bengal, off the coast of the Ganga-Brahmaputra Delta region. In the aftermath of the Bhola cyclone in 1970, it emerged in the Bay of Bengal on the Bangladeshi side of the dividing river, and disappeared before or during Cyclone Aila in 2009. In March 2010, Sugata Hazra of the School of Oceanographic Studies at Jadavpur University, Kolkata, said that the island had disappeared and that sea level rise caused by climate change was a factor.

The enclaves were reputedly part of a high stake card or chess games centuries ago between two regional kings, the Maharaja of Cooch Behar and the Nawab of Rangpur and the result of a confused outcome of a treaty between the Kingdom of Cooch Behar and the Mughal Empire. After the partition of India in 1947, Cooch Behar district joined India and Rangpur went to East Pakistan, which became Bangladesh in 1971. The prime ministers of India and Bangladesh signed a Land Boundary Agreement in 1974 to exchange enclaves and simplify the international border. In 1974 Bangladesh approved a proposed treaty to exchange all enclaves within each other's territories, but India did not ratify it. Another agreement was made in 2011 to exchange enclaves and adverse possessions. A revised version of the agreement was finally adopted by the two countries 41 years after negotiations began, when the Parliament of India passed the 100th Amendment Act to the Indian Constitution on May 7, 2015. Inside the main part of Bangladesh, there were 111 Indian enclaves (17,160.63 acres), while in the main part of India, there were 51 Bangladeshi enclaves (7,110.02 acres). In respect of adverse possessions, India received 2,777.038 acres of land and transferred 2267.682 acres to Bangladesh. India ratified the agreement by constitutional amendment in May 2015. Under this agreement, the enclave residents could continue to reside at their present location or move to the country of their choice. The adverse possession of Berubari went to Bangladesh. The unmarked borders between the nations were also finally solved regarding Daikhata-Dumabari, Muhurichar river island and Pyrdiwah.

See also 

 Climate of India
 Borders of India
 Extreme points of India
 Exclusive economic zone of India
 Geography of India
 Outline of India

References

External links
 Disputed territories of India

Territorial disputes of India